Redstone FM was a local, DAB-only radio station covering most of the region encompassing Surrey, Sussex, Crawley and South London, principally focused on Croydon.

Based in Redhill, the station took went on the air on December 16th, 2013. Broadcasting ceased in September of 2015.

History
Redstone FM was created in 2005. It ran six short-term restricted service licenses on FM radio, which served the towns of Redhill and Reigate.

Set up as a community group, the not-for-profit company applied for a community radio license in 2011, but lost out to Susy Radio 103.4.

Since that time (and the award of a DAB license by Ofcom ), its parent company "MuxCo" Surrey & Sussex Ltd shut them down for unknown reasons.

Local radio
Redstone FM was a local radio station, broadcasting from studios in Redhill, providing local news, music, public and private services/events details and entertainment.

Management
 Chairman - Rosie Mac
 Chief Executive - Des Shepherd
 Program Director - Steve Burge
 Finance Director - Nigel Peacock
 Speech Content - Johny Cassisy
 Volunteer Co-ordinator - Tess Lewsey

External links
 Redstone FM Website

Radio stations established in 2013
Radio stations in Surrey
Adult contemporary radio stations in the United Kingdom